WXIC (660 kHz) is a commercial AM radio station licensed to Waverly, Ohio, calling itself "Ohio's Gospel Giant."  It airs a Southern Gospel radio format and is owned by Crystal Communications Corp.  News updates are supplied by ABC News Radio .

By day, WXIC is powered at 1,000 watts using a non-directional antenna.  But because 660 AM is a clear channel frequency reserved for Class A WFAN New York City, WXIC is a daytimer and must sign off at night to avoid interference.  WXIC's signal covers South-Central Ohio and parts of Kentucky and West Virginia.

History
In 1954, the station first signed on as WPKO at 1380 kHz.  It originally was a country music station with some Southern Gospel music on Sundays.  In 1971, it added an FM sister station at 100.9, playing automated beautiful music.  Today that is co-owned WXIZ, a country music station.

The WPKO call sign is now being used at an FM station in Bellefontaine, Ohio.

References

External links

XIC
XIC
Radio stations established in 1954
1954 establishments in Ohio